Ivan Abramovich Morozov (November 27, 1871 – July 21, 1921) was a Russian businessman and, from 1907 to 1914, a major collector of avant-garde French art.

Early life
Ivan attended the Zurich Polytechnic from 1892 to 1894. Here he studied chemistry, but continued to paint in oil paint on Sundays.

Family
Ivan was a prominent member of the Morozov dynasty. He was the second son of Abram Abramovich Morozov and his wife Varvara Alekseevna Morozova. His elder brother was Mikhail Abramovich Morozov, and his younger brother Arseny Abramovich Morozov.

Collection
After the Bolshevik Revolution, Morozov's art collection was nationalized and divided between the Pushkin Museum, Moscow, and the Hermitage Museum, Leningrad.

Morozov's art collection has been jointly displayed with the collection of Sergei Shchukin. In 2008, the families of Morozov and Shchukin made efforts to compel Russia to provide them with “reasonable compensation,” which become an international legal and political issue. The families refused an offer of £5,000 to each family from the British Royal Academy in exchange for their promise not to make claims on the paintings while they were on loan to the Royal Academy for a special exhibition of the two collections in London.

See also 
The Night Café
Sergei Shchukin

References

Further reading
Natalya Semenova, Morozov: The Story of a Family and a Lost Collection, translated by Arch Tait. Yale University Press, 2020.

External links
Guggenheim Museum Biography 

1871 births
1921 deaths
Russian art collectors
Old Believers
Humanitarians from the Russian Empire